Jeroen Mettes (24 March 1978 – 21 September 2006) was a Dutch poet, essayist and blogger.

Life
Jeroen Mettes was born in Eindhoven and grew up in Valkenswaard. He studied philosophy in Utrecht, and literary studies at Leiden University, where he worked on his thesis on poetic rhythm until his death in 2006 in The Hague.

In 1999, he began writing the long prose-poem he called N30. This was the code-name of the 1999 Seattle protests organised during the WTO negotiations. The protesters were demanding a global recognition of fair trade, trade unions and environmental legislation. Seven years later, in 2006, Mettes had written a poem, 60,000 words long.

In 2005, Jeroen Mettes started the blog Poëzienotities (Poetry Notes). An important part of that blog was Poet Alphabet, in which Mettes discussed—in alphabetical order—the poetry he found in Verwjis Bookstore, in his hometown of The Hague. He started with the A (Anne van Amstel), and would end with the G (Goudeseune). As a poet, Jeroen Mettes debuted in the journal Parmentier. In his early twenties, he had already contributed prose to, among other magazines, Zoetermeer and Passionate. In 2006, Mettes joined the editorial staff of the magazine yang, while continuing to write for Parmentier.

On 21 September 2006, he published an empty post on his blog. That same day, he chose to end his life. He left behind his poems, essays and his blog.

Work
In 2011, Jeroen Mettes’ Nagelaten werk (Posthumous Works), consisting of two parts, was published by Wereldbibliotheek. His poetry was collected in the volume N30 +. This volume is mostly filled with the long prose poem N30, which consists of 32 chapters. A selection of blog entries and the surviving essays were bundled under the title Resistance Policy. The Flemish poet and literary scholar Geert Buelens wrote the afterword. The two parts of Nagelaten werk were compiled by Piet Joosten, Frans-Willem Korsten and Daniel Rovers.

Critical reception
Mettes was initially known for his blog, and is since gaining recognition for his work through the publication of N30. Mettes received critical recognition for his work from Samuel Vriezen, Eva Cox, J. H. De Roder, and later Jos Joosten, Geert Buelens and Marc Kregting. Excerpts from N30 were translated into English by Vincent W. J. van Gerven Oie, and published in Continent in 2012.

Mettes was posthumously nominated for the C. Buddingh prize for N30

See also 
 Language poets
 Bruce Andrews
 Experimental literature

References

External links 
N30

Dutch male poets
1978 births
2006 suicides
21st-century Dutch poets
20th-century Dutch poets
20th-century Dutch male writers
People from Eindhoven
Leiden University alumni
People from Valkenswaard
Dutch essayists
Dutch bloggers
Suicides in the Netherlands
21st-century Dutch male writers
Male bloggers
20th-century essayists
2006 deaths